The 2015 ASI Panthers season was the first season for the American Indoor Football (AIF) franchise, and their first and only season in the AIF.

On October 10, 2014, American Indoor Football (AIF) announced that the ASI Panthers would be joining the league as part 2015 expansion. The Panthers were officially announced as a 2015 expansion team of the AIF in November, 2014.

Regular season

Schedule

Standings

Postseason

Roster

References

ASI Panthers
ASI Panthers